7α-Hydroxyepiandrosterone (7α-OH-EPIA), also known as 3β,7α-dihydroxy-5α-androstan-17-one, is an endogenous, naturally occurring metabolite of epiandrosterone and dehydroepiandrosterone (DHEA) that is formed by the enzyme CYP7B1 in tissues such as the liver and brain.

See also
 7β-Hydroxyepiandrosterone
 7α-Hydroxy-DHEA
 7β-Hydroxy-DHEA
 7-Oxo-DHEA

References

Androstanes
Diols
Ketones